Caymus may refer to:

Caymus, California, former settlement
Rancho Caymus, land grant
Caymus Vineyards, Napa winery.